Kinser is a surname. Notable people with the surname include:

Cynthia D. Kinser (born 1951), American judge
Elbert L. Kinser (1922–1945), United States Marine and Medal of Honor recipient
Holly Kinser (born 1965), American lobbyist
John Douglas Kinser (1918–1951), American murder victim
Kraig Kinser (born 1984), American racing driver
Mark Kinser (born 1964), American racing driver
Sheldon Kinser (1942–1988), American racing driver
Steve Kinser (born 1954), American racing driver

See also
Camp Kinser, a United States Marine Corps base in Okinawa, Japan